This is a list of films produced by the Ollywood film industry based in Bhubaneshwar and Cuttack in 1991:

A-Z

References

1991
Ollywood
 Ollywood
1990s in Orissa
1991 in Indian cinema